Catillaria gerroana is a species of crustose lichen in the family Catillariaceae. Found in Australia, it was described as a new species in 2017 by lichenologists Patrick McCarthy and John Elix. The type specimen was collected in Black Head Reserve (Gerroa, New South Wales), where it was found growing on sandstone cliffs of the intertidal zone. The specific epithet refers to the type locality, which is the only location that this lichen is known to occur.

References

Lecanorales
Lichen species
Lichens described in 2017
Lichens of Australia
Taxa named by John Alan Elix